NGC 4414 is an unbarred spiral galaxy about 62 million light-years away in the constellation Coma Berenices. It is a flocculent spiral galaxy, with short segments of spiral structure but without the dramatic well-defined spiral arms of a grand design spiral. Three supernovae have been observed in this galaxy: SN 1974G (type I, mag 13), SN 2013df (Type II, mag 14), and SN 2021J (Type Ia, mag 12).

It was imaged by the Hubble Space Telescope in 1995, as part of the HST's main mission to determine the distance to galaxies, and again in 1999 as part of the Hubble Heritage project. It has been part of an ongoing effort to study its Cepheid variable stars. The outer arms appear blue due to the continuing formation of young stars and include a possible luminous blue variable with an absolute magnitude of −10.

NGC 4414 is also a very isolated galaxy without signs of past interactions with other galaxies and despite not being a starburst galaxy shows a high density and richness of gas – both atomic and molecular, with the former extending far beyond its optical disk.

NGC 4414 is a member of the Coma I Group, a group of galaxies lying physically close to the Virgo Cluster.

References

External links

Hubble Heritage Project NGC 4414

ESA/Hubble image of NGC 4414

Flocculent spiral galaxies
Unbarred spiral galaxies
Coma Berenices
4414
07539
40692
Coma I Group